Epix is the fomer name of MGM+, an American premium television channel owned by Metro-Goldwyn-Mayer.

Epix may also refer to:

 Epix (mobile phone), a Samsung mobile phone
 EPIX Pharmaceuticals Inc, a drug company

See also 
 Epic (disambiguation)
 Epyx, maker of video games